Vanessa Lynn Williams (born March 18, 1963) is an American singer, actress, and fashion designer. She gained recognition as the first African-American woman to receive the Miss America title when she was crowned Miss America 1984. She resigned her title amid a media controversy surrounding nude photographs of her being published on Penthouse magazine. Thirty-two years later, Williams was offered a public apology during the Miss America 2016 pageant for the events.

Williams rebounded from the scandal with a successful career as a singer and actress. In 1988, she released her debut studio album The Right Stuff, whose title single saw moderate success as well as "Dreamin' which peaked at number 8 in the United States in 1989. With her second and third studio albums, The Comfort Zone (1991) and The Sweetest Days (1994), she saw continued commercial success and received multiple Grammy Award nominations; this included her number-one single and signature song, "Save the Best for Last", which she performed live at the 1993 Grammy Awards ceremonies. Her later studio albums include Everlasting Love (2005) and The Real Thing (2009).

As an actress, Williams enjoyed success on stage and screen. She made her Broadway debut in 1994 with Kiss of the Spider Woman. In 2002 she starred as The Witch in the revival of Stephen Sondheim's Into the Woods which earned her a Tony Award for Best Actress in a Musical nomination. She starred in the revival of Horton Foote's The Trip to Bountiful in 2013, and the ensemble political farce POTUS: Or, Behind Every Great Dumbass Are Seven Women Trying to Keep Him Alive in 2022. She is also known for her appearances in television, with her best known roles being Wilhelmina Slater on Ugly Betty (2006–2010), for which she was nominated three times for the Primetime Emmy Award for Outstanding Supporting Actress in a Comedy Series; and Renee Perry on Desperate Housewives (2010–2012).

Early life and education
Vanessa Lynn Williams was born in the Bronx, New York City, with a birth announcement that read: "Here she is: Miss America". She was raised in Millwood, New York.

A paternal great-great grandfather was William A. Feilds, an African-American legislator in the Tennessee House of Representatives. Williams is also of English, Welsh, Irish, Finnish, Italian, and Portuguese descent. Her mother Helen Tinch met her father Milton Augustine Williams Jr. (1935–2006) while both were music education students at Fredonia State Teachers College in the late 1950s. They became elementary school music teachers in separate districts after marriage. Milton also served as the assistant principal of his school for an extended period of time.

Williams was raised Catholic, the religion of her father. Her mother, who had been raised Baptist, converted to Catholicism when she married. Williams was baptized at Our Lady of Grace Church in the Bronx. Her mother played the organ at St. Theresa's Church in Briarcliff Manor for weddings and at Mass, and Williams used to assist her mother by turning the pages of sheet music.

Williams and her younger brother Chris (who would later become an actor) grew up in Westchester County, a predominantly white middle to upper-class suburb of New York City. Williams believes she may have been the first African-American student to go from the first grade to the 12th grade in the Chappaqua Central School District.  She attended Robert E. Bell Middle School, as did her children years later.  Williams revealed that the shop and home economics teachers (Mr. and Mrs. Fink) were still there when her children attended.

A child of music teachers, Williams grew up in a musical household, studying classical and jazz dance, French horn, piano, and violin. She was offered the Presidential Scholarship for Drama to attend Carnegie Mellon University during the college application period, (one of 12 students to receive it) but decided instead to attend Syracuse University on a different scholarship. Thus, in 1981, Williams joined Syracuse's College of Visual and Performing Arts, Department of Drama as a musical theater major. She stayed at Syracuse through her second year until she was crowned Miss America 1984 in September 1983.

In May 2008, Syracuse granted Williams a Bachelor of Fine Arts degree. According to Syracuse News, "Williams earned the remaining credits for her degree through industry experience and her substantial performances on stage and screen." Williams also delivered the 2008 convocation address, telling Syracuse seniors to "treasure this moment. These days are irreplaceable and are the beginning of the rest of your life."

Name
Williams is most often publicly recognized simply as "Vanessa Williams". There is, however, occasional confusion with the similarly named actress Vanessa E. Williams. It has been reported that Vanessa L. first became aware of Vanessa E. in the 1980s when her New York University registrar told her that another, similarly aged student with the same name and from the same state had applied. When Williams appeared as Miss America in a Macy's Thanksgiving Day Parade, Vanessa E. accidentally received her check for the appearance, which she returned.

In the area of acting, the two ran into name conflict when Screen Actors Guild rules prohibited duplicate stage naming. Vanessa E. had registered the name "Vanessa Williams" first, so as a compromise, Williams was occasionally credited as "Vanessa L. Williams" in acting credits. To compound the confusion, both actresses starred in versions of the drama Soul Food (Williams in the film version, and Vanessa E. in its TV series adaptation). The Screen Actors Guild eventually took the issue to arbitration and decided both actresses could use the professional name "Vanessa Williams".

Miss America 

Williams was the first African-American recipient of the Miss America title when she was crowned Miss America 1984 in September 1983. Several weeks before the end of her reign, however, a scandal arose when Penthouse magazine bought and published unauthorized nude photographs of her. Williams was pressured to relinquish her title and was succeeded by the first runner-up: Miss New Jersey 1983, Suzette Charles. Thirty-two years later in September 2015, when Williams served as head judge for the Miss America 2016 pageant, former Miss America CEO Sam Haskell made a public apology to her for the events of 1984.

Career

Music
Williams first received public recognition for her musical abilities when she won the preliminary talent portion of the Miss America pageant with her rendition of "Happy Days Are Here Again" (Williams would later be crowned Miss America 1984). Four years later in 1988, Williams released her debut album, The Right Stuff. The first single, "The Right Stuff", found success on the R&B chart, while the second single, "He's Got the Look", found similar success on the same chart. The third single, "Dreamin'", was a pop hit, becoming Williams' first top 10 hit on the 1989 Billboard Hot 100, peaking at No. 8, and her first number one single on the Hot R&B/Hip-Hop Songs chart. The album reached platinum status in the U.S. and earned her an NAACP Image Award and three Grammy Award nominations, including one for Best New Artist.

Her second album The Comfort Zone became the biggest success in her music career. The lead single "Running Back to You" reached top twenty on the Hot 100, and the top position of Hot R&B/Hip-Hop Songs chart on October 5, 1991. Other singles included "The Comfort Zone" (#2 R&B), "Just for Tonight" (#26 Pop), a cover of The Isley Brothers' "Work to Do" (#3 R&B), and the club-only hit "Freedom Dance (Get Free!)". The most successful single from the album, as well as her biggest hit to date, is "Save the Best for Last". It reached No. 1 in the United States, where it remained for five weeks, as well as No. 1 in Australia, the Netherlands, and Canada, and was in the top 5 in Japan, Ireland and the United Kingdom. The album sold 2.2 million copies in the U.S. at its time of release and has since been certified triple platinum in the United States by the RIAA, gold in Canada by the CRIA, and platinum in the United Kingdom by the BPI.  Williams performed the song live at the 1993 Grammy Awards Ceremony. The Comfort Zone earned Williams five Grammy Award nominations.

The Sweetest Days, her third album, was released in 1994 to highly-favorable reviews. The album saw Williams branch out and sample other styles of music that included jazz, hip hop, rock, and Latin-themed recordings such as "Betcha Never" and "You Can't Run", both written and produced by Babyface. Other singles from the album included the adult-contemporary and dance hit "The Way That You Love" and the title track. The album was certified platinum in the U.S. by the RIAA and earned her two Grammy Award nominations.

Other releases include two Christmas albums, Star Bright in 1996, and Silver & Gold in 2004; Next in 1997, Everlasting Love in 2005, and The Real Thing in 2009, along with a greatest-hits compilation released in 1998, and a host of other compilations released over the years.
Chart performances from subsequent albums, motion picture and television soundtracks have included the songs "Love Is", which was a duet with Brian McKnight, the Golden Globe- and Academy Award-winning "Colors of the Wind", "Where Do We Go from Here?", and "Oh How the Years Go By".

In 1996, Williams performed the national anthem at Super Bowl XXX.

In April 2018, she announced she was working on a new studio album due in the Fall which would incorporate her R&B, pop & Broadway influences.

Television and film

Williams has had a successful career in television. Her first television appearance was on a 1984 episode of The Love Boat followed by guest appearances in a number of popular shows. In 1995, Williams starred as Rose Alvarez in a television adaptation of the 1960 Broadway musical Bye Bye Birdie  and portrayed the nymph Calypso in the 1997 Hallmark Entertainment miniseries The Odyssey. In 2001, Williams starred in the Lifetime cable movie about the life of Henriette DeLille, The Courage to Love  and in 2003, Williams read the narrative of Tempie Herndon Durham from the WPA slave narratives in the HBO documentary Unchained Memories: Readings from the Slave Narratives. In 2006, Williams received considerable media attention for her comic/villainess role as former model/magazine creative director turned editor-in-chief Wilhelmina Slater in the ABC comedy series Ugly Betty. Her performance on the series resulted in a nomination for outstanding supporting actress at the 59th Primetime Emmy Awards and in 2008 and 2009, she was nominated in the outstanding supporting actress in a comedy series category for Ugly Betty. Williams next joined the cast of Desperate Housewives for its seventh season, where she portrayed Renee Perry, an old college "frenemy" of Lynette Scavo (Felicity Huffman). In 2016, she joined the cast of The Librarians, as recurring villainess General Rockwell. She starred as Maxine in the VH1 television series Daytime Divas during its one season in 2017.

Williams has appeared in a number of feature films. She received a NAACP Image Award for Outstanding Actress in a Motion Picture for her portrayal of Teri Joseph for the 1997 feature film Soul Food. In 2007, she starred in the independent film My Brother, for which she won Best Actress honors at the Harlem International Film Festival, the African-American Women in Cinema Film Festival, and at the Santa Barbara African Heritage Film Festival. She also notably co-starred with Arnold Schwarzenegger in Eraser, Samuel L. Jackson in the 2000 soft reboot of Shaft, the characters from Sesame Street in The Adventures of Elmo in Grouchland (as the Queen of Trash), and with Miley Cyrus in Hannah Montana: The Movie.

Theatre 
Williams began her career on stage in the 1985 production, One Man Band, as one of "the women". She followed it in 1989 as "Laura" in Checkmates.

In 1994, she broadened her ascendant music career into a theatrical role when she replaced Chita Rivera as Aurora in the Broadway production of Kiss of the Spider Woman. In 1998, she portrayed Della Green in the revival of St. Louis Woman, and Carmen Jones in the 2002 Kennedy Center Special Performance of Carmen Jones. In the same year, she was also featured in the Tony/Drama Desk Award-winning revival production of Stephen Sondheim's Into the Woods, for which she was nominated for a Tony and Drama Desk Award for her performance as the Witch.  This production included songs revised for her. In 2010, Vanessa starred in a new Broadway musical revue entitled Sondheim on Sondheim, a look at Stephen Sondheim through his music, film and videotaped interviews. Sondheim ran from March 19 to June 13 at Studio 54 in New York City. In 2013, she starred as Jessie Mae Watts in the Horton Foote play The Trip to Bountiful, which was later turned into a 2014 television film. In 2014, she starred in the Broadway musical, After Midnight and in 2015 she appeared in a PBS production of Show Boat as Julie La Verne. Williams will star as Margaret in POTUS: Or, Behind Every Great Dumbass Are Seven Women Trying to Keep Him Alive on Broadway, with performances beginning on April 14, 2022 at the Shubert Theatre.

Additional roles

Williams served as the host of the 1994 Essence Awards, co-host of Carnegie Hall Salutes the Jazz Masters: Verve Records at 50, host of the 1998 NAACP Image Awards, host of the 2002 documentary, It's Black Entertainment, host of The 6th Annual TV Land Awards in 2007, host of the 36th Annual Daytime Emmy Awards in 2009, and finally host of the documentary Dreams Come True: A Celebration of Disney Animation (2009).

Williams is a spokesmodel for Proactiv Solution, and was the first African-American spokesmodel for L'Oréal cosmetics in the 1990s. In 2018, Williams returned as a spokesmodel for L'Oréal as part of their 'Age perfect' campaign alongside fellow ambassadors Helen Mirren, Julianne Moore and Jane Fonda.
She appeared on Who Wants to Be a Millionaire in 2000 as a contestant, and once again on August 10, 2009, as a celebrity guest during the show's tenth anniversary prime-time special editions, winning $50,000 for her charity.

In a commercial that began running during Super Bowl XLVI in 2012, Williams voiced the new character Ms. Brown, a brown M&M.

In 2020 Williams was the winner of episode 2 of RuPaul's Secret Celebrity Drag Race, and donated her prize of $20,000 to the LBGTQ charity The Trevor Project.

Fashion
In March 2016, Williams launched her own clothing line, V. by Vanessa Williams, for EVINE Live.

Personal life 
Williams and her mother Helen co-authored a memoir titled You Have No Idea, published in April 2012. In the book, Williams discusses her childhood, rise to fame, and personal struggles (including life with type 1 diabetes), including the fact that she was sexually molested by a woman when she was ten years old. She also spoke candidly about having an abortion while she was in high school.

Williams is a practicing Catholic, something she spoke about on the ABC News program Focus on Faith with Fr. Edward L. Beck.

Williams is involved with a number of humanitarian causes. She is a supporter of LGBT rights and same sex marriage, and in 2011 participated in the human rights campaign New Yorkers for Marriage Equality. She is partnered with Dress For Success, an organization that provides professional attire for low-income women seeking employment. Williams is also involved with The San Miquel Academy of Newburgh, a school for boys at risk.

Williams has been married three times. She married Ramon Hervey II at St. Francis Xavier Catholic Church in 1987 just a few years after giving up her Miss America crown, and gave birth to her first child at that time. Hervey was a public relations specialist who was hired to resuscitate her career after her resignation. They had three children, Melanie, Jillian, and Devin, and divorced in 1997. She married NBA basketball player Rick Fox in 1999. They had one daughter, Sasha Gabriella Fox, and divorced in 2004. In 2015, she married Jim Skrip, a businessman from Buffalo, New York at St. Stanislaus Catholic Church, after receiving a Church annulment of her first marriage.

Her daughter Jillian Hervey is an American singer, dancer and member of the group Lion Babe.

Honors and awards

Williams is the recipient of many awards and nominations including Grammy nominations for hits such as "The Right Stuff", "Save the Best for Last", and "Colors of the Wind". In addition, she has earned multiple Emmy nominations, a Tony Award nomination, seven NAACP Image Awards, and four Satellite Awards.

She received a star on the Hollywood Walk of Fame on March 19, 2007.

In December 2017, Vanessa L. Williams participated at COAF  Gala fundraising event, delivering a special performance of her Golden Globe and Academy Award-winning song "Colors of the Wind" and paid tribute to Patricia Field, with whom she worked on the set of the TV series Ugly Betty.

Discography

 The Right Stuff (1988) 
 The Comfort Zone (1991)
 The Sweetest Days (1994)
 Star Bright (1996)
 Next (1997)
 Silver & Gold (2004)
 Everlasting Love (2005)
 The Real Thing (2009)

Filmography

Film

Television

Theatre

Bibliography

See also

 List of artists who reached number one in the United States
 List of artists who reached number one on the U.S. dance chart
Children of Armenia Fund

References

External links

 
 
 
 

 
1963 births
20th-century American women singers
20th-century American singers
21st-century American women singers
21st-century American singers
Actresses from New York City
African-American actresses
African-American Catholics
African-American fashion designers
African-American women singers
American people of English descent
American people of Welsh descent
American people of Irish descent
American people of Finnish descent
American people of Italian descent
American people of Portuguese descent
American contemporary R&B singers
American dance musicians
American fashion designers
American women pop singers
American film actresses
American soul singers
American television actresses
American voice actresses
Beauty pageant controversies
Concord Records artists
Lava Records artists
American LGBT rights activists
Living people
Mercury Records artists
Miss America 1980s delegates
Miss America Preliminary Talent winners
Miss America winners
Miss New York winners
People with type 1 diabetes
Polydor Records artists
Syracuse University alumni
African-American beauty pageant winners
Catholics from New York (state)
Entertainers from the Bronx
Horace Greeley High School alumni
Singers from New York City
American women fashion designers
African-American history of Westchester County, New York